Allium pendulinum, called Italian garlic, is a plant species known only from Sardinia, Sicily, Corsica and mainland Italy.

Allium pendulinum is a perennial herb up to 25 cm tall but usually much shorter. It generally produces only leaves, both of which wither before flowering time. There is no spathe at flowering time. Umbel has only a few flowers, usually less than 10, all on long pedicels and very often drooping (nodding, hanging downward). Tepals are white, each with three thin prominent green veins; anthers cream; ovary at flowering time green.

References

External links
 

pendulinum
Onions
Flora of Italy
Flora of Corsica
Plants described in 1811